Ganeshpur , is a Village headed by Grampanchayat in Bhandara district  in the state of Maharashtra, India. It is situated near of Wainganga River. The town is attached to the Bhandara City. The National Highway NH53 indicates the border of Ganeshpur. It is a Marathi-speaking Village. The name Ganeshpur is indicate god Ganapati name. The caste mostly found in Village is don baili teli and koshti  also and other.

Ethnic groups, language and religion

 India census, Ganeshpur had a population of 8183. Males constitute 52% of the population and females 48%. Ganeshpur has an average literacy rate of 83%, higher than the national average of 59.5%: male literacy is 88%, and female literacy is 78%. In Ganeshpur, 10% of the population is under 6 years of age.

References

Cities and towns in Bhandara district